Wombarra is a northern seaside suburb of Wollongong, on the south coast of New South Wales, Australia. Its main street is Lawrence Hargrave Drive. Wombarra is an Aboriginal term meaning "Black Duck".

Wombarra has a cemetery, lawn bowling club, Catholic church and a railway station.

Notable residents
Kathy Jackson, former national secretary of the Health Services Union and Fair Work Commissioner Michael Lawler

References

Suburbs of Wollongong